Amber Elaine Glenn (born October 28, 1999) is an American figure skater. She is the 2022 Skate America bronze medalist, the 2021 CS Golden Spin of Zagreb silver medalist, the 2019 CS U.S. Classic bronze medalist, and the 2021 U.S. national silver medalist. She has finished within the top ten at two ISU Championships. Earlier in her career, she won bronze at two ISU Junior Grand Prix events (2013 JGP Czech Republic, 2014 JGP France) and gold at the 2014 U.S. Junior Nationals.

Personal life 
Glenn was born October 28, 1999, in Plano, Texas. Her father, Richard, works as a police officer. Glenn, who identifies as both bisexual and pansexual, is the only openly LGBTQ ladies' figure skater on Team USA . In November 2020, she revealed that she worked with the creative team of the Yuri!!! on Ice movie during production in August 2017.

Career 
Glenn began learning to skate in 2004. She won a bronze medal at the 2013 Junior Grand Prix (JGP) event in the Czech Republic and became a national junior champion at the 2014 U.S. Championships. Ranked fifth in the short program and eighth in the free skate, she finished seventh at the 2014 World Junior Championships in Sofia, Bulgaria. She trained in McKinney, Texas and at Stonebriar Ice in Frisco, Texas until the rink closed in 2014.

2014–15 season
In May 2014, U.S. Figure Skating named Glenn as the recipient of the 2014 Athlete Alumni Ambassador (3A) overall award. In August, she won bronze at the 2014 JGP in France. She finished sixth at her second JGP assignment in Estonia and 13th on the senior level at the 2015 U.S. Championships.

2015–16 season
Glenn began the 2015–2016 season training in McKinney, Texas under Ann Brumbaugh and Ben Shroats. After placing fifth at the 2015 JGP in Latvia and sixth on the senior level at the 2015 Skate Canada Autumn Classic in mid-October, she decided to take a break to "reevaluate". She resumed training in February 2016 after joining Peter Cain and Darlene Cain in Euless, Texas.

2016–17 season
Glenn placed fifth at the 2016 CS Nebelhorn Trophy, fourth at the 2016 CS Golden Spin of Zagreb, and eighth at the 2017 U.S. Championships. She was selected to compete at the 2017 World Junior Championships but withdrew in early March.

2017–18 season
Glenn finished eighth at the 2017 CS Lombardia Trophy. She was invited to compete at her first Grand Prix event, the 2017 Cup of China, after the withdrawal of Gracie Gold. She placed tenth in China and finished the season with a second consecutive eighth-place at the 2018 U.S. Championships.

2018–19 season
Glenn was sixth at the 2018 CS Lombardia Trophy and seventh at the 2019 U.S. Championships.

2019–20 season
Competing on the Challenger series again at the start of the 2019–2020 season, Glenn won the bronze medal at the 2019 CS U.S. Classic.  This was her first senior international medal.  Assigned to two Grand Prix events, she placed seventh at the 2019 Skate America and sixth at the 2019 Cup of China.
She was fourth in the short program at the 2020 U.S. Championships with a clean skate and, remarking on her then-recent coming out, said it "has brought a weight off my shoulders. It was very scary, and not having to pretend I’m someone I’m not anymore.  She dropped to fifth place after the free skate and said further mental preparation was needed.  Glenn finished ninth at the 2020 Four Continents Championships, her first senior ISU championship assignment.

2020–21 season
The coronavirus pandemic prompted a multi-month hiatus from training, after which Glenn began working on mastering the triple Axel, which she had been attempting "for fun" periodically for nine years by that point.  She missed an early virtual competition due to fracturing her orbital bone after passing out cryotherapy but then attempted the triple Axel for the first time in competition during a later virtual domestic event, singling it.

With the pandemic restricting international travel, the ISU opted to conduct the Grand Prix assignments based mainly on training location.  Glenn was assigned to compete at the 2020 Skate America.  She placed fifth in the Skate America short program after having to execute a turn in between her triple-triple jump combination.  She was sixth in the free skate, remaining in fifth place overall.

Glenn attempted her triple Axel in the short program at the 2021 U.S. Championships but was unable to land it successfully. Her otherwise strong performances earned her her highest-ever placement at the event and first senior national medal, a silver. She expressed that she was "happy to finally put out a performance I'm proud of." Glenn revealed that she had been suffering from a foot infection that had spread up to the knee and had begun a course of antibiotics on the day of the free skate.

Despite her silver medal, U.S. Figure Skating opted to name bronze medalist Karen Chen, who had finished 0.35 points behind Glenn, alongside champion Bradie Tennell to the 2021 World Championships team. It was the first time since 2008, when Katrina Hacker was bypassed in favor of Kimmie Meissner, that the selected ladies team in a non-Olympic year did not follow Nationals placements (for age-eligible skaters). Glenn was instead named first alternate.  She had previously said, when asked about the prospect of the World team, "US Figure Skating should go with a team that they know will go and get those three spots back. Whether that includes me or not, I’m all for it either way."

2021–22 season
Glenn withdrew from the Skating Club of Boston's Cranberry Cup event and then made her full competitive debut at the 2021 CS Finlandia Trophy, where she placed tenth.

Beginning the Grand Prix at 2021 Skate America, Glenn did not attempt a triple Axel in competition after practice session difficulties. Seventh in both segments of the competition, she placed sixth overall with a score of 201.02, breaking 200 points internationally for the first time. Speaking afterward, she said, "breaking that point target internationally for the first time, it really makes me feel like I'm up there, and it's not just, ‘Oh, she got second at Nationals; she did this in her own country.’ I know I can hold my own internationally, and this is just a taste of that." She went on to finish seventh at the 2021 NHK Trophy.
 
Glenn concluded the fall season at the 2021 CS Golden Spin of Zagreb, where she won the silver medal. Attempting to qualify for the American Olympic team at the 2022 U.S. Championships in January, Glenn struggled in the short program and finished fourteenth in that segment. She tested positive for COVID-19 afterward and withdrew before the free skate. She was named as an alternate for the Olympic team. Glenn would later reflect that while she had not assumed that going to the Olympics was possible for most of her career due to the expectations raised after the previous national championships, "I felt like I was expected to make it, so that made it all the more devastating. It was hard."

2022–23 season
Before starting the season, Glenn relocated to Colorado Springs, Colorado to train under Damon Allen, Tammy Gambill, and Viktor Pfeifer. She said her departure from the Cains was amicable, reasoning that "I needed to grow, not just as a skater, but as a human. I lived in the same city, the same place, my entire life."

Glenn started off her season with a bronze medal at the Skating Club of Boston's Cranberry Cup event before finishing fourth at the 2022 CS Lombardia Trophy. On the Grand Prix at 2022 Skate America, Glenn scored a personal best in her short program of 68.42, placing third in that segment and then third in the free skate as well to take the bronze medal. This was her first Grand Prix figure skating medal. On her performance in the free skate, she said afterward that "knowing that I didn't feel 100% out there when I was skating and how much room for improvement, the possibilities are endless. It really kind of just blew my mind that I'm finally starting to reach my potential." For the 2022 NHK Trophy, she vowed she was "not playing it as safe" as she had at her first event, "I'm just going to really try and go all out." The short program in Sapporo was a struggle, putting a hand down on her jump combination and then underrotating and falling on her final triple loop. She finished eleventh of twelve skaters in that segment. Glenn voiced her disappointment, saying, "it's so disheartening to have a skate like that after working so hard." She placed eighth in the free skate but remained eleventh overall.

Glenn described "mixed emotions" approaching the 2023 U.S. Championships after her disappointment the previous year. In the short program she made an error on her triple loop jump, but still placed fourth in the segment. In the free skate she stepped out of her opening triple Axel attempt, but landed six other clean triples, despite doubling one planned triple and singling a planned double Axel. She was third in that segment, rising to win the bronze medal. Glenn said she was happy with how she performed, and that she had enjoyed the experience of the national championships and the crowd support.

Assigned to the 2023 Four Continents Championships, Glenn placed fourth in the short program, 1.76 points behind third-place Kim Chae-yeon of South Korea. Her only error in the performance was putting a hand down on her solo triple loop. Glenn said that she "didn't feel as energetic" as she had wanted to be. Continuing to feel sick, she made two jump errors in the free skate and dropped to seventh overall, but said that she was glad to have stayed in a "decent mental place" given the difficulties.

Programs

Competitive highlights 
GP: Grand Prix; CS: Challenger Series; JGP: Junior Grand Prix

2012–present

2009–2012: Juvenile to novice levels

Detailed results

Senior level

Junior level

References

External links 
 

1999 births
American female single skaters
Living people
People from Plano, Texas
American LGBT sportspeople
Pansexual women
LGBT figure skaters
LGBT people from Texas
Bisexual women
Bisexual sportspeople
21st-century LGBT people
21st-century American women